Chechian is a town and union council of Gujrat District, in the Punjab province of Pakistan.

References

External links 
 http://www.chechian.webs.com
 http://chechiangrt.tk
 http://www.chechiangrt.xtgem.com/

Union councils of Gujrat District
Populated places in Gujrat District